The 1924–25 Swiss National Ice Hockey Championship was the 15th edition of the national ice hockey championship in Switzerland. HC Rosey Gstaad won the championship by defeating HC Davos in the final.

First round

Eastern Series 
 EHC St. Moritz - HC Davos

HC Davos qualified for the final.

Western Series 
 HC Château-d’Œx - HC Rosey Gstaad 1:6

HC Rosey Gstaad qualified for the final.

Final 
 HC Davos - HC Rosey Gstaad 1:9

External links 
Swiss Ice Hockey Federation – All-time results

National
Swiss National Ice Hockey Championship seasons